Le tue mani is a 1970 Easter song written by Marcello Giombini.

The song is a so-called response song, which is sung between men and women, and was probably first presented in Sweden at a hymnology seminar during the early 1970s, before Lars Åke Lundberg wrote lyrics in Sweden. However, he wrote the fourth verse as a prayer to the resurrected Jesus. The 1976 Church Assembly wanted to change lyrics. That caused Lars Åke Lundberg to withdraw his entire propose for lyrics, and all verses were approved.

Publications

Swedish-language version
Published as number 154 in:
 Den svenska psalmboken 1986,
 1986 års Cecilia-psalmbok
 Psalmer och Sånger 1987
 Segertoner 1988
 Frälsningsarméns sångbok 1990 under the lines "Påsk" (Easter).

References

1970 songs
Easter hymns
Italian songs
Italian-language songs
Songs about Jesus